Éder José de Oliveira Bonfim (born 3 April 1981) is a retired Brazilian professional footballer who played as a right back.

Football career

Early years / Portugal
Born in Mineiros, Goiás, Bonfim started professionally with Grêmio Esportivo Inhumense. In January 2002 he signed a five-year contract but, after just five games for the first team, he was successively loaned to Portuguese clubs: S.L. Benfica, C.F. Estrela da Amadora, S.C. Braga and Vitória de Setúbal.

In 2005, Éder joined another Primeira Liga side, U.D. Leiria, being first-choice for the duration of his spell.

Romania
In the summer of 2008, Bonfim signed with FC Timişoara. In January of the following year, he had a brief loan spell with fellow Liga I team FC Gloria Buzău; upon his return, he became a first-team regular.

Subsequently, Éder moved to country giants FC Steaua București. On 16 August 2010 he made his league debut for the capital side, against FC Victoria Brăneşti.

On 4 May 2011, Éder terminated contract with Steaua by mutual agreement. He left his following club, FK Khazar Lankaran in Azerbaijan, on 26 July 2013, following a 0–8 home defeat to Maccabi Haifa F.C. for the season's UEFA Europa League.

Honours
Vitória Setúbal
Taça de Portugal: 2004–05

Steaua București
Cupa României: 2010–11

References

External links

1981 births
Living people
Sportspeople from Goiás
Brazilian footballers
Association football defenders
Primeira Liga players
Liga Portugal 2 players
S.L. Benfica footballers
C.F. Estrela da Amadora players
S.C. Braga players
Vitória F.C. players
U.D. Leiria players
Liga I players
FC Politehnica Timișoara players
FC Gloria Buzău players
FC Steaua București players
Azerbaijan Premier League players
Khazar Lankaran FK players
Brazilian expatriate footballers
Expatriate footballers in Portugal
Expatriate footballers in Romania
Expatriate footballers in Azerbaijan
Brazilian expatriate sportspeople in Portugal
Brazilian expatriate sportspeople in Romania
Brazilian expatriate sportspeople in Azerbaijan